Beijing Daxing International Airport , is one of two international airports serving Beijing, the other one being Beijing Capital International Airport (PEK).  It is located on the border of Beijing and Langfang, Hebei Province.  It has been nicknamed "the starfish."  It was completed on June 30, 2019, and began operations on September 26, 2019.

It is a hub for SkyTeam alliance airlines and some Oneworld members, while Hainan Airlines and most Star Alliance members have remained at Beijing Capital International Airport.

The airport won awards for best hygiene measures and best in size and region in 2020, and both awards plus Voice of the Customer in 2021 by Airports Council International.

Development history
A third airport for Beijing was proposed in 2008.  By 2012, the existing Beijing Capital International Airport was running at near its full design capacity.

Initial proposals
Early media reports in September 2011 suggested that there could be up to nine runways at the new airport: eight runways for civil aviation plus one runway dedicated to military usage. It would replace Beijing Capital International Airport (which had 83 million passengers in 2013, second most in the world) as the main airport of Beijing, and be the largest in China. The airport was planned to be able to handle 120 to 200 million passengers a year, which, if capacity were fully used, would make it the world's busiest airport by passenger traffic, surpassing Hartsfield–Jackson Atlanta International Airport by far.

Approval for construction
Official approval for construction by National Development and Reform Commission on December 22, 2014. It called for an airport to be constructed in the southern part of Daxing District of Beijing, along the border of Beijing and Hebei Province. No design or plans were released due to ongoing negotiations. It was stated that it would consist of 7 runways, 6 for civilian use and 1 for military purposes. Construction has been completed as of September 2019 with a capacity of handling 75 million passengers by 2025. The cost of construction was initially estimated to be at least 70 billion RMB (US$11.2 billion), including the  Beijing–Xiong'an intercity railway (Beijing section), to Beijing West railway station.

Design and contractors
The airport's master plan was prepared by NACO (Netherlands Airport Consultants) and will feature a ground transportation hub providing the airport with public transportation links to high-speed rail, metro, expressways, Beijing Airport Bus routes, local buses and inter-airport transportation system. The terminal building was designed by British architects Zaha Hadid Architects, French planners ADPI and partners, and executed by the Beijing Institute of Architectural Design (BIAD). It consists of a central hub with six curved spokes. The façade was designed by XinShan Curtainwall and Beijing Institute of Architectural Design. Arup was subcontracted by Beijing Institute of Architectural Design as the fire engineering consultant, while China IPPR International Engineering was responsible for security system and baggage system designs. BuroHappold Engineering, as part of the consortium, worked with the architects to integrate engineering solutions into the design of the airport.

Hong Kong design studio Lead 8 was appointed as lead designer of the integrated service building (the sixth pier) in 2018. The terminal, according to Lead 8, will encompass "a purposeful design of work spaces, with integrated retail, dining, and entertainment options for the large number of passengers expected," with plans to incorporate interactive pet hotels, a childcare and nursery, hybrid online retail and dining, and a showroom for companies.

Other contractors involved in the project include China Electronics Engineering Design Institute, Civil Aviation Electronic Technology, The Third Rail Survey and Design Institute Group Corporation (TSDI China), Beijing City Construction Design Research General Institute and Beijing General Municipal Engineering Design & Research Institute.

Beijing TsingHua TonHeng Urban Planning and Design Institute, Central Academy of Fine Arts, Dtree, Lea-Elliot, Lighting Design Studio, and East Sign Design & Engineering were also involved in the project.

Suppliers include Xsight Systems, T-Systems, Schindler, Thales, Beijing EasySky Technology and Oasys.

Construction
Construction of the airport began on December 26, 2014, and was led by chief engineer Guo Yanchi. By March 2017, the terminal had its concrete structure capped. On January 23, 2019, the first flight inspection began to be carried out and was expected to be completed in March.

On June 30, 2019, the airport officially finished construction and was in preparation for its September opening. The construction of the airport itself cost CN¥120bn (approximately US$17bn), with other projects in the periphery costing CN¥330bn (US$46.2bn), giving a total cost of CN¥450bn (US$63bn).

Opening

The airport opened on September 25, 2019—just six days before the 70th anniversary of the People's Republic of China—in a ceremony attended by the Chinese president and General Secretary of the Communist Party Xi Jinping. Inaugural flights from seven Chinese airlines began later in the afternoon, although flights operating out of the airport on the day were member-only, with the first official flight out of the airport an Airbus A380 operated by China Southern Airlines. Flights for the public began the following day on 26 September 2019. The first commercial flight landed at Beijing Daxing at 10:12 (UTC+8), September 26, 2019.

The airport serves as the hub for China United Airlines immediately after its opening and all their services have been relocated to Beijing Daxing. Others, such as China Eastern Airlines and China Southern Airlines, will also relocate.

Upon opening of the Daxing Airport, Beijing Nanyuan Airport, the oldest airport in China, closed on the same day. A military airfield will coexist in Daxing, as was the case in Nanyuan.

Service development 

It was initially planned for airlines of the SkyTeam alliance to be relocated to the new airport, while Star Alliance airlines would remain at Capital, effectively making both airports hubs. This was confirmed in 2016, when the Civil Aviation Administration of China announced that China Southern Airlines, China Eastern Airlines and XiamenAir along with other SkyTeam airlines would move to the new airport, while Air China and other Star Alliance carriers would remain at Capital. China Southern, China Eastern and Beijing Capital Airlines' intentions to move to Daxing were confirmed by a Xinhua report in December 2017.

Ten passenger airlines (China Southern Airlines, China United Airlines, Shanghai Airlines, Beijing Capital Airlines, Hebei Airlines, Spring Airlines, Okay Airways, Juneyao Airlines, XiamenAir and Donghai Airlines) and one cargo airline (China Postal Airlines) signed agreements with the Capital Airport Group to enter the new airport.

CAAC required each Mainland Chinese airline (other than China Postal Airlines) to serve only one Beijing-area airport following the opening of Daxing, but allowed foreign airlines (including Hong Kong, Macau and Taiwan-based airlines) to operate from both airports if they wished to do so. China Eastern Group and China Southern Group were each allocated 40% of landing slots with the remaining 20% for smaller Mainland China and international airlines. However, on 1 May 2019, this plan was changed by CAAC, with China Eastern Group relinquishing 10% of its allocated slots (to give it 30% of slots) to Air China Group in exchange for the China Eastern group continuing to operate its Shanghai-Beijing flights at Beijing Capital Airport.

SkyTeam members are slowly moving services to Daxing. China Eastern Airlines has moved some select domestic destinations to Daxing while retaining a large presence at Capital. It will launch new international routes to Paris and Tokyo at the end of March 2020. Similarly, XiamenAir will move it hub routes to Fuzhou and Xiamen at the end of March 2020 whilst retaining other domestic destination at Capital. Their global partners Delta Air Lines will supposedly move at the end of April and Aeroflot will move at the beginning of June.

The Oneworld alliance announced in February 2019, that its member airlines were considering a formal co-location scheme at Daxing, particularly as many of them, now have codeshare partnerships with China Southern. Alliance members, British Airways and Malaysia Airlines moved their London-Heathrow and Kuala Lumpur to Beijing flights to Daxing whilst Finnair flies from Helsinki-to-Daxing as well as retaining a daily flight to Capital. S7 Airlines will move all its flights covering five Russian destinations to Daxing from Capital on March 29, 2020.  Qatar Airways has also announced its intention to move to Daxing between June and August 2020. American Airlines will relocate from Capital to Daxing due to its close partnership with China Southern. Royal Air Maroc which joined the alliance on 1 April 2020 already operates out of Daxing. Cathay Pacific reportedly intends to stay at Capital.

Some foreign Star Alliance airlines are joining full member Air China and connecting partner Juneyao at Daxing. In January 2020, LOT Polish launched a 4-weekly flight from Warsaw, complementing its three-weekly flight to Capital. Also in January 2020, Lufthansa and Swiss International Air Lines announced that they will move their Frankfurt- and Zurich-Beijing flights from Capital to Daxing at the end of March 2020. Atfer all, these plans did not materialize because of the worldwide COVID-19 pandemic.

On October 25, 2020, China Southern Airlines transferred all its Beijing flights to Daxing Airport.

Airport facilities 

The first phase of the airport project is designed with a target of 72 million passengers, 2 million tons of cargo and mail, and 620,000 aircraft movements in the long term.

Airlines and destinations

Passenger

Cargo

Ground transportation 

The airport is linked to the city through various means of transportation, and a ground transportation center was constructed beneath the terminal building for this purpose. Two underground railway stations (for Beijing–Xiong'an intercity railway and Intercity Railway Connector) and three metro stations (Daxing Airport Express, Line 20 (Line R4) and another planned metro line) were built beneath the terminal building. Currently, only one of the metro lines (Daxing Airport Express) and one of the railway lines (Beijing–Xiong'an intercity railway) are in operation. The airport is also served by a highway system including  and  connecting the airport and Beijing city.

Intercity rail 

A high-speed railway service, the Beijing–Xiong'an intercity railway starts from Beijing West railway station. It will connect the urban area of Beijing, Daxing District of Beijing, Bazhou, and Xiong'an to the new airport. The airport-to-Beijing section was opened on September 26, 2019, while the airport-to-Xiong'an section is expected to open in late 2020. It will take 28 minutes from Beijing West railway station to the new airport.

Another intercity railway, the Intercity Railway Connector, will connect Langfang, Yizhuang, Beijing Sub-administrative Center in Tongzhou District and Beijing Capital International Airport to Daxing Airport. Phase I of the intercity railway connector (Daxing Airport to Langfang East railway station) is under construction. Phase 1 of the railway will be finished in December 2022. The speed will be 200 km/h.

Another high-speed railway service, the Tianjin–Daxing Airport intercity railway, will connect Tianjin West railway station with Daxing Airport. Construction will finish in 2022. The speed will be 250 km/h.

Subway 

The Daxing Airport Express of the Beijing Subway connects the airport to the urban area of Beijing and began operation on September 26, 2019. The line links  station on Line 10 to the airport. Initially, only the Caoqiao-to-airport segment was opened, with a northern extension to  scheduled to begin construction in 2020 and finish in 2022.

In the long term planning of the Beijing Subway, Line 20 (Line R4) of the Beijing Subway is planned to terminate at the new airport.

Statistics
Below is the passenger data and development for Beijing Daxing International Airport as of year 2020:

See also 
 List of busiest airports by cargo traffic
 List of busiest airports by passenger traffic
 List of the busiest airports in China
 List of airports in China
 Civil aviation in China

Notes

References

External links

Official Website (Chinese)

Airports in Beijing
Buildings and structures in Daxing District
Airports established in 2019
2019 establishments in China
Guangyang District
Airports in Hebei